"She Make It Clap" is a single by American rapper Soulja Boy. The song was initially self-released on March 15, 2021, before seeing a wider global release under Virgin Music on April 5, 2021. Following its release, the song gained tens of millions of plays across streaming platforms, while also reaching number 23 on the US Billboard Mainstream R&B/Hip-Hop Airplay, as well as both the US and Global Billboard Top Triller charts.

Soulja Boy previewed two unreleased remixes of the song, one with French Montana, and the other with Nicki Minaj during a live Verzuz match with American rapper Bow Wow

Production
According to Soulja Boy, the song was recorded during a live Twitch broadcast as a freestyle, on his personal computer.

Dance and music video
Soulja Boy originally self-promoted the song on the Chinese video-sharing platform TikTok by doing an assortment of short dances to the beginning of the song, eventually fleshing out the dance and starting a viral trend on both the TikTok and Triller platforms, accumulating millions of views on both the original videos and various user-made video replies.

The music video was directed by Dale Resteghini. It begins with Soulja Boy making a video call to a friend on his cellphone to tell him the song has gone viral; it then moves on to show Soulja Boy, accompanied by several celebrities and TikTok users, as well as many women in bikinis, performing the dance to the song in various locations both in and outside a luxury mansion. The video premiered on YouTube on April 30, 2021. The video features rappers Desiigner, Chief Keef, and several female dancers doing the dance from the viral TikTok videos.

Charts

References

2021 singles
2021 songs
Soulja Boy songs
Songs written by Soulja Boy
Music videos directed by Dale Resteghini